Lentinula novae-zelandiae, also known as New Zealand shiitake, is a species of edible saprobic fungus endemic to New Zealand.

Phylogenetic research suggests this species forms a monophyletic clade of Laurasian origins. It can be cultivated, with cultures and grow kits available commercially in New Zealand.

References

External links 
 

Fungi of New Zealand
Edible fungi
Fungi in cultivation
Fungi described in 1983
Marasmiaceae